The 1962 Wisconsin Badgers football team represented the University of Wisconsin in the 1962 NCAA University Division football season.  Wisconsin was the Big Ten Conference champion and was ranked second in both final major polls, released in early December. This remains the highest season-ending ranking in program history (since the polls' inception in 1936 (AP) and 

Wisconsin met the #1 USC Trojans in the historic  the first bowl game in college football history to pair the top two ranked teams in the nation.  This Wisconsin team is also tightly linked to the resurgence of the program in the 1990s through  end Pat Richter, who returned as athletic director in 1989 and hired head coach

Season
Wisconsin opened the season by crushing New Mexico State and then subdued Indiana 30–6. On October 13, they defeated Notre Dame 17–8, which gave them a number 10 ranking. The Badgers then defeated the Iowa 42–15, which moved them up to fifth. A 14–7 loss to Ohio State the following week dropped Wisconsin out of the polls (top ten only).

On November 3, the Badgers defeated struggling Michigan on the road, 34–12. This set up following week's homecoming game versus #1 Northwestern at Camp Randall Stadium. Eighth-ranked Wisconsin soundly defeated Northwestern 37–6, and moved up to fourth in the next poll. A win at Illinois set up a #3 Wisconsin vs #5 Minnesota battle for Paul Bunyan's Axe. Wisconsin won 14–9, securing the Big Ten title and the berth in the Rose Bowl, as well as a season-ending #2 ranking.

The Badgers faced #1 USC in the historic Rose Bowl; the first bowl game in college football history between the top two teams in the polls, and the final rankings were already set. At the time, the two major polls (AP, UPI) released their final editions prior to the bowl games, so Wisconsin's runner-up rank went unchanged after the bowl loss.

Quarterback Ron Vander Kelen seemingly "come from nowhere" to lead the Badgers to a conference championship; he had missed the 1960 season due to an injury, and was declared academically ineligible for 1961. He was named the Big Ten Conference MVP for 1962 in his only season of play (except for late-game mop-up in 1959 

Senior end Pat Richter was a unanimous consensus All-America selection and came in sixth in the Heisman Trophy voting for 1962.  He was inducted into the College Football Hall of Fame in 1996.  Despite his an accomplishments as a player, he may be better known to younger generations for hiring coach Barry Alvarez when he became the athletic director at Wisconsin decades later. Junior center Ken Bowman played ten seasons with the Green Bay Packers, winning three consecutive NFL titles under head coach Vince Lombardi.

Schedule and results

Roster
E Pat Richter
QB Ron Vander Kelen

Team players in the 1963 NFL Draft

 No Wisconsin Badgers were selected in the 1963 AFL Draft.

References

Wisconsin
Wisconsin Badgers football seasons
Big Ten Conference football champion seasons
Wisconsin Badgers football